Headstone is a residential area north-west of Harrow, London, and immediately north of North Harrow. A green buffer exists between Headstone and North Harrow that consists of a moated manor site (Headstone Manor) and football and rugby pitches, making the area mostly separate from North Harrow. However, there are some points of flux and overlap. To the west the area abuts the large and predominantly agricultural pasture of Pinner Park.

History
Headstone Manor is fourteenth century with many later additions and renovations: it is a significant place of interest in its own right. The manor had an unrivalled status, see manorialism until after the Reformation and formation of the British Empire and to an extent, usually for such a site, relatively close to London, even until the Enlightenment which sparked the Industrial Revolution. This has led to the barns having remained largely intact to the present.

Housing

Headstone South is predominantly made up of 1930s semi-detached housing.

Amenities

Harrow Weald Common adjoins the northern border of the area, open for walking and mountain biking equally, this is on the northern boundary of Harrow Weald (marked by Uxbridge Road). On this common which rises steeply in the north to climb the hill of Weald Wood, towards the southwestern, Headstone, side is the Bannister Sports Centre, an athletics track and training ground.

Pinner Park features a miniature railway and a cricket ground with pavilion.

St George's Anglican parish church, serving the area, was built by John Samuel Alder and consecrated in 1911.

Transport

The area benefits from frequent bus services towards the more commercialised Harrow, to Hatch End very close to the north, to Pinner south-westwards and Stanmore, north-eastwards.

Headstone Lane railway station has three trains per hour in both directions. The station is on the line between Watford Junction and London Euston, providing a fast but stopping service to these destinations and a therefore less convenient service without changing once for destinations of Aylesbury and Milton Keynes; it marks the heart of the neighbourhood, parts of which around the manor recreation grounds merge seamlessly with the area to the south, North Harrow.

Notes

References

Districts of the London Borough of Harrow
Areas of London
Places formerly in Middlesex